Leonard Gibbard Stileman-Gibbard  born Leonard Gibbard Stileman (23 December 1902 – 29 September 1957) was an English first-class cricketer.

The son of Major-General William Stileman, he was born in British India at Bombay in June 1856. He was educated in Britain at the Abderdeen Gymnasium and Brighton College, before going up to Trinity College, Cambridge. He succeeded his uncle, John Gibbard at Sharnbrook House in 1871, assuming the additional name of Gibbard in 1878. He made a single appearance in first-class cricket for the South against the touring Australians at Hastings in 1886. Batting twice in the match, he was dismissed in the South's first-innings for 46 runs by George Giffen, while in their second-innings he was dismissed by the same bowler for 9 runs. From November 1890 he served as a justice of the peace for Bedfordshire. He played minor counties cricket for Bedfordshire from 1901–05, making thirteen appearances in the Minor Counties Championship. He was made a deputy lieutenant for Bedfordshire in March 1906. He served as a deputy lieutenant until January 1939, when he resigned his commission. He died at Sharnbrook in September 1939. He was the brother of Harry Stileman and Charles Stileman.

References

External links

1856 births
1939 deaths
People from Mumbai
People educated at Brighton College
Alumni of Trinity College, Cambridge
English cricketers
North v South cricketers
Bedfordshire cricketers
English justices of the peace
Deputy Lieutenants of Bedfordshire